is a former Japanese football player.

Career
Kota Saito promoted J1 League club Albirex Niigata from youth team in 2015. On September 9, he debuted in Emperor's Cup (v Blaublitz Akita) and got a goal.

References

External links

1997 births
Living people
Association football people from Yamagata Prefecture
Japanese footballers
J1 League players
Albirex Niigata players
Association football midfielders